The LG Versa (VX9600) is a mobile phone for use on the Verizon Wireless network. Like the LG Dare VX-9700, the Versa has a full touch screen and onscreen QWERTY keyboard. The Vers also accepts handwriting recognition or gesture control for entering phone numbers and typing. The phone includes a HTML mobile web web browser, a built-in MP3 music player, access to Verizon Wireless's VCAST multimedia services, and mobile e-mail services. The phone includes a 2.0-mp digital camera with zoom, autofocus, and flash. The phone also had a built-in camcorder. An expandable MicroSD card slot is included into the phone, though no MicroSD card is pre-installed into the device. The difference between the LG Dare and the Versa is that the Versa featured a unique, foldout QWERTY keyboard that was detachable. Originally included with the Versa, the QWERTY keyboard was no longer included and only available as an accessory at Verizon Wireless retail stores. The attachment also included send and end call keys so that the user could answer an incoming call even with the flip closed. The attachment also included an integrated LED display screen that displayed information such as the currently-playing music track, current time, current date, signal strength, type of CDMA signal (1X or 3G) that the phone was currently operating on, the network provider's name, and who is calling, should an incoming call come through when the case is attached and closed.

Features 
Network
Type: CDMA Dual Band (800 / 1900 MHz)
Data: CDMA 2000 1xRTT / 1xEV-DO Rev.0 / 1xEV-DO Rev.A
3G Capable: Yes
Size
Dimensions: 4.16 x 2.07 x 0.54 inches
Weight: 3.81 oz
Battery
Type: Li – Ion, 1100 mAH
Talk: 4.83 Hours (290 Minutes)
Standby: 430 Hours (18 Days)
Main Display
Resolution: 240 x 480 Pixels
Type: 262,144 TFT
Physical Size: 3.00 Inches
Features: Light Sensor
Touch Screen: Yes With Hand Writing Recognition
Additional Display
Resolution: 120 x 56 Pixels
Type: Monochrome OLED
Features: Only Available On The QWERTY Keypad Attachment
Camera
Resolution: 2.0 Megapixels
Video Capture: Yes
Features: Auto focus, Flash (LED), Digital Zoom, White balance, Effects, Panorama
Multimedia
Video Playback: MPEG 4, 3GP, 3GP2, WMV
Music Player: MP3, AAC, ACC+, WMA
Memory
Memory Slot: Micro SD/Micro SDHC
Built In: 310 MB
Input
Keypad: Detachable
Connectivity
USB: Micro USB
Bluetooth: Version 2.1, Stereo Bluetooth
Connectors: Headset Jack (2.5mm)

References

External links 
LG Versa Review
LG Versa Phonescoop
LG Versa Forum

VX9600
Mobile phones introduced in 2009